Stoke Ash is a village and civil parish in the Mid Suffolk district of Suffolk in eastern England. Located around six miles south of Diss, in 2011 its population was 314. The village shares a parish council with neighbouring Thwaite. It is located on the A140 road from Norwich to Ipswich The name 'Stoke', comes from 'stoc', which means a place or a secondary settlement in old English. The word 'Ash', comes from the Anglian word 'æsc', which means ash-tree. The name Ash was added to the name Stoke in the sixteenth century. In 1086 Stoke Ash was known as Stoches Stotas.

Early history
There is evidence of Roman settlement in Stoke Ash. A collection of Roman coins and pottery pieces have been found in the area. There is a small Roman site located "on the Colchester to Caistor Roman road". There are Roman tiles in the wall of the tower over the doorway in the All Saints Church. Some military items and pieces of overseas household articles have also been found.

History
In 1801, the population was divided into "those 'chiefly employed in agriculture', those 'chiefly employed in trade, manufacturers or handicraft', and others." 
In 1831, 56 percent of the population were labourers and servants. Twenty percent were the middle class and 15 percent were employers and professionals. Only 2 percent was classed as 'other'. Kelly's Directory of Suffolk (1900), described the soil as being mixed, consisting of subsoil and clay. The chief crops were wheat, barley and beans. The area was said to be 1,200 acres. The Parish School, which included both girls and boys, consisted of 50 children, with an average attendance of 47. The pie chart shows the social status of men above the age of 20 in the year 1831. The "middle sorts" are a combination of farmers who do not pay for labourers and masters and skilled workers in urban manufacturing and handicrafts.

Present Day

The village consists of a church called All Saints, a village hall and green, a post office, a public house and a boarding kennels and cattery called Quiet Acres . The A140 splits the village into two. To the east of the A140 are most of the houses, the church, village halls and post office, making this area the main part of the village. The Baptist church and six more homes are situated to the north of the village. The primary school and the White Horse Inn are located on the west side of the A140.

The average population is older than the national average of the UK and also that of Suffolk. According to the UK 2011 Census, Stoke Ash does not have a large immigrant population as it has a low rate of inhabitants born in other EU countries or outside the EU. It has a higher level of residents born in the UK than the national average. The residents stating their health as 'very good' in the 2011 UK census was higher than the national average. The residents stating their health as 'very bad' was lower than the national average which suggests that people in Stoke Ash are generally more satisfied with their health than the average person in the UK. Stoke Ash has a higher rate of home ownership, either completely or on contract compared to the national average, which suggests that Stoke Ash is a relatively wealthy place. The pie chart shows the occupational statistics of 2011. Almost all the main jobs in 2011 have an equal number of people working in those sectors. This shows social structure has improved drastically because in 1831 most people were servants.

All Saints Church
The church of All Saints is visible across a field to the east of the A140. The bell openings of the 14th century tower have decorated tracery there is a later West window and a substantial stair turret which rises on the Southside. Flint pebbles lie in courses on the North wall and the round arches of the low blocked nave door and priest's door in the chancel all showing that the church was begun in the Norman period.  
The three light nave window has decorated tracery with four petals within a circle and mouchettes either side. The east window is a 19th century replacement and there are tall thin perpendicular windows to the South. Flushwork diamond crosses or worked on two nave buttresses and may consecration crosses although their high position is unusual. The late 15th century brick porch has a niche over the outer arch and there is the vestige stoop by the inner door the windows in decorated style were inserted when Richard Phipson and carried out a major restoration in 1868 the Norman inner doorway is entirely plain and is only 6ft high and 3ft 6in wide. Phipson stripped out the plaster ceilings to reveal a scissor braced roof with heavier arch braces in the chancel coming well down the walls. The benches are to his design and the stools in the chancel incorporate fine mediaeval poppyheads.  
The tower arch is tall and thin and at the base stands the crown of a mediaeval bell this was cast by the earliest known foundry of Bury St Edmunds between 1460 and 1480. The inscription on this bell reads “Credo in Deum Patrem Omni Potentem” which translates from Latin as “I believe in God and the father almighty.” Over the South door hangs a dark set of Hanoverian royal arms relabelled for William IV in 1836, they are painted on wooden board and have a pedimented top. There is now no chancel arch or screen but the stairs which led to the rood loft rise within the window embrasure on both side the early 17th century pulpit close by has blind arches in the panels and contains bird beak forms in the scrolls, the lower panels are renewals. The small priest’s door lies within a much larger and later pointed arch and in the north wall of the sanctuary there is a large plain recess. Its depth suggests that it was an aumbry but with chamfered edges and is therefore unlikely to have had a door.  
The decalogue is painted on a 19th century zinc plate on the east wall along with the piscina which lacks its drain. in the window alongside there are 15th century glass fragments including depictions of a single hand and a book.  
The register dates back from the year 1550.

The White Horse Inn
The White Horse Inn is a bed and breakfast which is situated on the A140 close to the town of Eye in Suffolk, midway between Ipswich and Norwich. It dates back to 17th century when it was a Coaching Inn. It was built during the reign of Charles I of England.

References

External links

Stoke Ash and Thwaite Parish Council

Villages in Suffolk
Civil parishes in Suffolk
Mid Suffolk District